Wouk is a surname. Notable people with the surname include:

Herman Wouk (1915–2019), American writer
Victor Wouk (1919–2005), American scientist and pioneer in the development of electric and hybrid vehicles, brother of Herman

See also
Vouk